Northland (often known as the Northland Taniwha) are a New Zealand professional rugby union team based in Whangārei, New Zealand. The union was originally established in 1920, with the National Provincial Championship established in 1976. They now play in the reformed National Provincial Championship competition. They play their home games at Semenoff Stadium in Whangārei in the Northland region. The team is affiliated with the Blues Super Rugby franchise. Their home playing colours are sky blue.

Current squad

The Northland Taniwha squad for the 2022 Bunnings NPC.

Honours

Northland have never been overall Champions. Their full list of honours, though, include:

National Provincial Championship Second Division North Island
Winners: 1977 (as North Auckland)

National Provincial Championship Second Division
Winners: 1997

Current Super Rugby players
Players named in the 2022 Northland Taniwha squad, who also earned contracts or were named in a squad for any side participating in the 2022 Super Rugby Pacific season.

References

External links
Official site
Fan site

National Provincial Championship
New Zealand rugby union teams
Sport in the Northland Region